Your Mind Is on Vacation is an album by American pianist, vocalist and composer Mose Allison recorded for the Atlantic label in 1976. The album cover was designed by Seymour Chwast.

Reception

Allmusic awarded the album 4½ stars and its review by Scotty Yanow states, "It seems strange to realize that this was Mose Allison's only recording during the 1973–1981 period".

Track listing
All compositions by Mose Allison except as indicated
 "Your Mind Is on Vacation" – 2:34
 "Foolin' Myself" (Jack Lawrence, Peter Tinturin) – 2:52
 "No Matter" – 3:40
 "One of These Days" – 4:29
 "I Feel So Good" – 2:25
 "Fires of Spring" – 2:57
 "If You Only Knew" – 2:42
 "I Can't See for Lookin'" (Arnold Stanford, Nadine Robinson) – 3:57
 "What Do You Do After You Ruin Your Life" – 3:23
 "Swingin' Machine" – 4:08
 "Perfect Movement" – 3:30
 "Your Molecular Structure" – 2:16

Personnel 
Mose Allison – piano, vocals
Jack Hannah – bass
Jerry Granelli – drums 
Al Porcino – trumpet (tracks 1, 4, 6, 7 & 12)
David Sanborn – alto saxophone (tracks 1, 4, 6, 7 & 12)
Al Cohn (tracks 2 & 8), Joe Farrell (tracks 1, 4, 6, 7 & 12) – tenor saxophone

References 

1976 albums
Mose Allison albums
Atlantic Records albums
Albums produced by Joel Dorn